Cervibunus is a genus of harvestmen in the family Sclerosomatidae from South and Southeast Asia.

Species
 Cervibunus ater Roewer, 1955
 Cervibunus maculatus Roewer, 1912
 Cervibunus ornatus Roewer, 1929

References

Harvestmen